The Doamna is a right tributary of the river Bistrița in Romania. It flows into the Bâtca Doamnei Reservoir near Piatra Neamț.

References

Rivers of Romania
Rivers of Neamț County